The 2004 Slovak Figure Skating Championships were held in Bratislava from 10 to 11 January 2004. Skaters competed in the disciplines of men's singles, ladies' singles, pair skating, and ice dancing on the senior level.

Results

Men

Ladies

Pairs

Ice dancing

External links
 results

Slovak Figure Skating Championships, 2004
Slovak Figure Skating Championships
2004 in Slovak sport